Óscar Julián Ruiz Acosta (born 1 November 1969, in Villavicencio) is a former Colombian football referee and current referee instructor. He is also a lawyer.

Career
He had been a referee since 1 January 1995, and his international debut was on 12 July 1995 (Paraguay vs. Venezuela). He officiated in the 2002, 2006 and 2010 FIFA World Cups.

He was preselected as a referee for the 2010 FIFA World Cup and sent off Yoann Gourcuff in the France vs. South Africa match.

FIFA appointed Ruiz as a referee instructor and member of CONMEBOL's referee assistance program.

References

External links
Profile Weltfussball

1969 births
Living people
Colombian football referees
2006 FIFA World Cup referees
Copa América referees
2010 FIFA World Cup referees
2002 FIFA World Cup referees
FIFA World Cup referees
People from Villavicencio
CONCACAF Gold Cup referees